The Championships of the Small States of Europe (CSSE) is a biennial competition in outdoor track and field organised by the Athletic Association of Small States of Europe (AASE). First held in 2016, the competition is held on alternate years with the Games of the Small States of Europe. 

The idea for a stand-alone athletics championships for European small states arose through discussions with AASE president Edwin Attard and European Athletic Association president Hansjörg Wirz. The European small states traditionally sent a combined team to the European Team Championships, but following that competition's change to a biennial format a gap in the sporting calendar emerged. Competing nations used the competition to help their athletes push for qualifying standards to the European Athletics Championships and Summer Olympics.

The 2020 edition of the competition, originally set for 4–6 June at the San Marino Stadium, was postponed due to the COVID-19 pandemic.

Editions

Participation

Medal table (2016-2022)

References

External links
AASE Official website

 
Athletics competitions in Europe
International athletics competitions
Recurring sporting events established in 2016
2016 establishments in Europe
Biennial athletics competitions